Ina Marie Minjarez (born March 27, 1975) is a lawyer and a former Democratic member of the Texas House of Representatives representing District 124 in San Antonio, Texas. She was sworn into office on April 30, 2015, after winning a special election on April 21. She served as Assistant District Attorney for Bexar County from 2000 through 2006.

Minjarez handily won election to her second full term in the general election held on November 6, 2018. With 31,674 votes (67.6 percent), she topped her conservative Republican challenger, Johnny S. Arredondo, who finished with 15,151 votes (32.4 percent). Arredondo formerly ran unsuccessfully for the San Antonio City Council. He carried the support of Governor Greg Abbott in the race against Minjarez.

Sponsored legislation
In 2016, Minjarez sponsored "David's Law", legislation aimed at preventing cyberbullying.

References

External links
Legislative page
 Ina Minjarez at the Texas Tribune

Living people
Democratic Party members of the Texas House of Representatives
University of Notre Dame alumni
Texas lawyers
21st-century American politicians
Hispanic and Latino American state legislators in Texas
Hispanic and Latino American women in politics
Women state legislators in Texas
1975 births
21st-century American women politicians